Goran Simić (born 1952) is a Serbian-Canadian poet from Bosnia and Herzegovina, recognized internationally for his works of poetry, essays, short stories and theatre.

Biography
Simić was born in Vlasenica, Bosnia and Herzegovina in 1952 and has written eleven volumes of poetry, drama and short fiction, including Sprinting from the Graveyard (Oxford, 1997). His work has been translated into nine languages and has been published and performed in several European countries. One of the most prominent writers of the former Yugoslavia, Simić was trapped in the Siege of Sarajevo. In 1995 he and his family were able to settle in Canada as the result of a Freedom to Write Award from PEN. Immigrant Blues was Simic's second full-length volume of poems in English, and the first to be published in Canada.  This was followed by two books published in 2005: a poetry collection, From Sarajevo, With Sorrow—which involves a retranslation of the earlier, bowdlerized versions found in David Harsent's Sprinting from the Graveyard; and Yesterday's People, a collection of short fiction, which was shortlisted for both the Relit Award and the Danuta Gleed Award for best first collection of short fiction.  (both published by Biblioasis.)  A Selected Poems is tentatively scheduled to be published in the Fall of 2007. In 2010, Simić published two more books: a poetry volume entitled Sunrise in the Eyes of the Snowman (Biblioasis) and his second collection of stories, Looking for Tito (Frog Hollow Press).

In 2006, Simić founded Luna Publications in Toronto, Canada. Simić joined the Faculty of Arts and Sciences of the University of Guelph in September 2006.

In 2013, he returned to live in Sarajevo.

Personal
His brother Novica Simić was a general in the Army of Republika Srpska.

References 

Living people
1952 births
People from Vlasenica
20th-century Canadian poets
20th-century Canadian male writers
Bosnia and Herzegovina poets
Canadian male poets
Canadian book publishers (people)
Academic staff of the University of Guelph
Bosnia and Herzegovina people of Serbian descent